Paulo Lamego (26 May 1950) is a sports shooter, who represented Brazil at the 1976 Summer Olympics.

Lamego competed in the mixed 50 metre free pistol event at the 1976 Summer Olympics in Montreal, and after scoring 544 points he finished in 29th place.

Two years later Lamego competed in the 1978 ISSF World Shooting Championships in Seoul, South Korea, where he won the bronze medal in the 10 metre air pistol event and followed it up with a silver medal in the team event.

References

1950 births
Brazilian male sport shooters
Olympic shooters of Brazil
Shooters at the 1976 Summer Olympics
Sportspeople from Rio de Janeiro (city)
Living people
21st-century Brazilian people
20th-century Brazilian people